The Pasar Besar Klang LRT station is a light rapid transit (LRT) station that serve the suburb of Kawasan 17 Klang in Selangor, Malaysia. It is one of the stations on the Shah Alam line. The station is an elevated rapid transit station in Klang, Selangor, Malaysia, forming part of the Klang Valley Integrated Transit System.

The station is marked as Station No. 18 along the RM9 billion line project with the line's maintenance depot located in Johan Setia, Klang. The Pasar Besar Klang LRT station is expected to be operational in February 2024 and will have facilities such as multi-story park and ride, kiosks, restrooms, elevators, taxi stand and feeder bus among others.

Locality landmarks
 Pasar Besar Klang
 Klang Parade
 TM Point Klang
 Taman Bunga Melor, Klang
 Batu Belah
 Mutiara Bukit Raja
 Bandar Bukit Raja

References

External links
 LRT3 Bandar Utama–Klang line

Rapid transit stations in Selangor
Shah Alam Line